SpongeBob SquarePants: Plankton's Robotic Revenge is an action-adventure platform video game developed by Behaviour Interactive and published by Activision, based on the SpongeBob SquarePants series by Nickelodeon; in the game, players control SpongeBob, Patrick, Squidward, Mr. Krabs and Sandy as they attempt to stop Plankton from stealing the Krabby Patty formula; it was released on October 11, 2013 in North America for the PlayStation 3, Xbox 360, Wii, Wii U, Nintendo DS and Nintendo 3DS.

Previous SpongeBob games were published by THQ, who had the license since 2001, but following their liquidation on January 23, 2013, Activision took over the license. Upon release, Plankton's Robotic Revenge was met with generally negative reviews, with many criticizing the gameplay as boring and repetitive.

Gameplay
Players can purchase and upgrade their weapons of choice. The PlayStation 3, Xbox 360 and Wii versions of the game feature four-player co-op, whilst the Wii U version allows for an additional fifth player when using a GamePad with four other controllers. Portable versions are solely single-player games. The playable characters include SpongeBob, Patrick, Squidward, Sandy, and Mr. Krabs.

Plot
A cargo ship accidentally drops batteries into the ocean. Plankton finds them and uses them to power his giant robot and robot army and takes the safe with the Krabby Patty secret formula. He also takes the map to the key and the two copies of it that opens the safe. SpongeBob and his friends have to stop him, defeat his robot minions and family members, retrieve the batteries, and find the three keys before he does to get the formula back. They fight Plankton in the Dutchman's Triangle, but he retreats. The team then fight two of Plankton's family members, who also have giant robots, in other areas. After getting the first two keys and batteries, they go back to the Krusty Krab and battle Plankton again. After he is defeated, they retrieve the last battery and find the last key under the doormat and use it to open the safe. In the bottle was a note saying the formula is in Mr. Krabs' pocket the whole time. Squidward expresses his shock that they have been through the whole thing for nothing. That night, when SpongeBob and Patrick are watching TV in Patrick's house, SpongeBob wonders where the batteries went and is amazed that Patrick's TV is working so well. It is then revealed that the batteries were powering the TV from the outside.

Development
The game was announced on July 25, 2013. A trailer for the game was released the same day.

Reception

IGN panned the game with a score of 3.5 out of 10 saying "This simple, short, and uninteresting game just drops on the deck and flops like a fish." Both the UK and Australian PlayStation Official Magazine were mixed with a 5 out of 10. Official Xbox Magazine UK said the game was "occasionally difficult, never fun."

Nintendo Life in a review for the Wii U release rated it 4 out of 10 calling it an "uninspired, repetitive game that does nothing with the boundlessly bonkers potential of its legendary license." Chris Morris of Common Sense Media rated it 2 out of 5, ending the review stating "this might be a good game for a 5- or 6-year-old, but, as it stands, it's not a good choice for anyone."

GamingBolt gave the game a 7 out of 10, making it the game's only positive review.

Notes

References

2013 video games
PlayStation 3 games
Xbox 360 games
Wii games
Wii U games
Wii U eShop games
Nintendo DS games
Nintendo 3DS games
Nintendo 3DS eShop games
Activision games
Behaviour Interactive games
Video games developed in Canada
Video games developed in the Netherlands
Plankton's Robotic Revenge
Video games based on television series
Action-adventure games
Platform games
Multiplayer and single-player video games
Cooperative video games
3D platform games
Engine Software games